Minnesota Senate, District 20 is a district of the Minnesota Senate which covers a majority of Rice County, all of Le Sueur County, and part of Scott County in southeastern Minnesota.

Elections

List of senators 

 Kevin Dahle (January 8, 2013 - January 2, 2017)
 Rich Draheim (January 3, 2017 – present)

References 

 

Minnesota Senate districts
Rice County, Minnesota
Le Sueur County, Minnesota
Scott County, Minnesota